Hortonville is a village in Outagamie County, Wisconsin, United States. The population was 2,711 at the 2010 census.

Hortonville is located in the Fox Cities region and the Appleton-Oshkosh-Neenah, WI CSA, the third largest metropolitan area in Wisconsin.

History
In 1848, a man by the name of Alonzo Horton purchased 1,500 acres from the governor of Wisconsin, now known as the Town of Hortonia and the Village of Hortonville, for only 70 cents per acre. The first thing Horton did was build a cabin; by damming the Black Otter Creek, which created the  Black Otter Lake. After laying out a plat for the community by buying land and platting it off in 1849, Horton was swayed westward by the California Gold Rush. He later developed the city of San Diego, California.

On August 11, 1894, the settlement was incorporated as the Village of Hortonville. At that time, it had one of the first match light factories in the world.

During World War II, a German POW camp was established in Hortonville along County Hwy MM on the north side of the village.

On March 18, 1974, the teachers at the Hortonville Community School went on strike, an event that received national news coverage.

In 1981, the Hortonville Community Hall, now known as the Hortonville Opera House, was added to the National Register of Historic Places.

Geography
Hortonville is located at  (44.335196, -88.638847).

Black Otter Lake
The community is located on the shores of the  Black Otter Lake. It is drained by Black Otter Creek, which flows into the Wolf River just north of the village. The total watershed for the lake is estimated to be .

The Black Otter is the only public access lake in Outagamie County. Because of this, it receives substantial recreational use, primarily by anglers, throughout the year. Fish species in the lake include: bluegill, largemouth bass, black crappie, yellow perch, northern pike and catfish.

The village maintains: two public boat launches, a kayak launch, fishing pier and three parks along the shores of the lake.

Wolf River

The village is located approximately 2 miles south of the Wolf River. Buchman Access, a public boat launch, is located along County M. The river is also the border between the Town of Hortonia and the Town of Liberty.

Demographics
Hortonville is a part of the Appleton-Oshkosh-Neenah CSA, a Combined Statistical Area that includes the Appleton, Wisconsin metropolitan area (Calumet and Outagamie counties) and Oshkosh-Neenah (Winnebago County) metropolitan areas, which had a combined population of 358,365 at the 2000 census.

2010 census
As of the census of 2010, there were 2,711 people, 1,045 households, and 766 families residing in the village. The racial makeup of the village was 96.9% White, 0.2% African American, 0.2% Native American, 1.2% Asian, 0.4% from other races, and 1.1% from two or more races. Hispanic or Latino of any race were 1.5% of the population.

There were 1,045 households, of which 38.8% had children under the age of 18 living with them, 57.1% were married couples living together, 10.6% had a female householder with no husband present, 5.6% had a male householder with no wife present, and 26.7% were non-families. 22.0% of all households were made up of individuals, and 7.3% had someone living alone who was 65 years of age or older. The average household size was 2.59 and the average family size was 3.01.

The median age in the village was 36.7 years. 26.9% of residents were under the age of 18; 7.5% were between the ages of 18 and 24; 29% were from 25 to 44; 25.2% were from 45 to 64; and 11.4% were 65 years of age or older. The gender makeup of the village was 49.2% male and 50.8% female.

2000 census
At the 2000 census, there were 2,357 people, 871 households and 634 families residing in the village. The population density was 868.2 per square mile (335.8/km2). There were 904 housing units at an average density of 333.0 per square mile (128.8/km2). The racial makeup of the village was 96.99% White, 0.13% African American, 0.04% Native American, 2.21% Asian, 0.17% from other races, and 0.47% from two or more races. Hispanic or Latino of any race were 0.64% of the population.

There were 871 households, of which 38.9% had children under the age of 18 living with them, 60.5% were married couples living together, 9.0% had a female householder with no husband present, and 27.1% were non-families. 22.4% of all households were made up of individuals, and 8.8% had someone living alone who was 65 years of age or older. The average household size was 2.70 and the average family size was 3.21.

29.7% of the population were under the age of 18, 7.6% from 18 to 24, 31.3% from 25 to 44, 20.8% from 45 to 64, and 10.6% who were 65 years of age or older. The median age was 34 years. For every 100 females, there were 92.9 males. For every 100 females age 18 and over, there were 91.7 males.

The median household income was $51,635 and the median family income was $55,298. Males had a median income of $41,689 compared with $24,680 for females. The per capita income for the village was $20,277. About 4.4% of families and 6.9% of the population were below the poverty line, including 12.2% of those under age 18 and 6.0% of those age 65 or over.

Transportation

Roads

Airports
Appleton International Airport (ATW), is located 10 miles (16 km) southeast of Hortonville, and provides commercial airline service to the village.
Black Otter Airport (9WI1) is a privately owned grass strip, located just east of the Black Otter Lake. Permission is required to land here.

Rail
The fox valley and lake superior rail system operates the former Canadian National railway tracks which is also the former Fox Valley & Western Railroad track along the southern edge of the village, with a freight station near S Nash Street. It also operates 3 crossings - one at W Main Street/ WIS 15, another at S Lincoln Street, and a third at S Nash Street.

Religion
The Wisconsin Evangelical Lutheran Synod has a church in Hortonville: Bethlehem Lutheran Church, which dedicated a new church in April 2018. Ss. Peter and Paul Catholic Community, a Roman Catholic church, has been in Hortonville since 1897.

Education
The Hortonville Area School District, which includes a high school, two middle schools and three elementary schools, serves the village and the surrounding communities. Bethlehem Lutheran School is a 4K-8th grade Christian school of the Wisconsin Evangelical Lutheran Synod in Hortonville.

Local Businesses

Businesses

Brick's Hortonville Hardware
Gardan Inc.
Gilbert's Sentry Foods
Heritage Animal Hospital
Smiles By Design 
Wolf River Community Bank

Local Bars & Restaurants

Alley Cat Coffeehouse
Black Otter Supper Club
Charlie's Drive-In
Damn Yankees Watering Hole
Hardtails Saloon
Hog Haven Saloon
Loose Wheel Supper Club
Otter Creek Bar & Grill
Pork's Sports Bar & Grill

Parks

Alonzo Park, located along East Main Street, features a playground, covered pavilion with tables, and a grass walking trail through the woods.
Miller Park, located along West Main Street near the Black Otter Creek, offers a playground, two tennis courts and a baseball diamond.
Black Otter Park is located along West Main Street, and features a lonesome covered picnic table, as well as a kayak launch for access to the Black Otter Lake.
Commercial Club Park is a privately-owned park located along County Highway M, and features a playground, pavilion, baseball diamond, and a basketball court.

Points of interest
 Black Otter Lake
 Eagle Creek and Grand View Golf Clubs
 Wiouwash State Trail
 Wolf River

Notable people
 Dave Gassner, professional baseball player
 David Hodgins, Wisconsin legislator
 Isaac N. McComb, Wisconsin legislator and physician
 Charlie Nagreen, inventor of the hamburger
 Gerald Nye, U.S. Senator from North Dakota
 Alexander B. Whitman, Wisconsin legislator

Images

References

External links

 Village of Hortonville
 Hortonville Chamber of Commerce
 Hortonville Public Library
 Sanborn fire insurance maps: 1894 1901 1909

Populated places established in 1848
Villages in Outagamie County, Wisconsin
Villages in Wisconsin
1848 establishments in Wisconsin
Appleton–Fox Cities metropolitan area